The following German Baseball teams, in the 2020 season, will participate in the 1st and 2nd divisions of the Baseball Bundesliga:

1. Bundesliga North
 Berlin Flamingos
 Bonn Capitals
 Cologne Cardinals
 Dohren Wild Farmers
 Dortmund Wanderers
 Hamburg Stealers
 Paderborn Untouchables
 Solingen Alligators

1. Bundesliga South
 Buchbinder Legionäre Regensburg
 Haar Disciples
 Heidenheim Heideköpfe
 Mainz Athletics
 Mannheim Tornados
 Stuttgart Reds
 Tübingen Hawks
 Ulm Falcons

2. Bundesliga North

North-West
 Paderborn Untouchables (reserve team)
 Bonn Capitals (reserve team)
 Cologne Cardinals (reserve team)
 Düsseldorf Senators
 Ennepetal Raccoons
 Wesseling Vermins
 Wuppertal Stingrays

North
 Bremen Dockers
 Dohren Wild Farmers (reserve team)
 Elmshorn Alligators
 Hamburg Knights
 Hamburg Stealers (reserve team)
 Holm Westend 69ers
 Kiel Seahawks

North-East
 Berlin Flamingos (reserve team)
 Berlin Sluggers
 Braunschweig 89ers
 Hannover Regents

2. Bundesliga South

South-West
 Bad Homburg Hornets
 Darmstadt Whippets
 Frankfurt Eagles
 Heidelberg Hedgehogs
 Hünstetten Storm
 Mainz Athletics (reserve team)
 Mannheim Tornados (reserve team) 
 Saarlouis Hornets

South
 Augsburg Gators
 Ellwangen Elks
 Heidenheim Heideköpfe (reserve team)
 Neuenburg Atomics
 München-Haar Disciples (reserve team)
 Stuttgart Reds (reserve team)

South-East
 Baldham Boars
 Buchbinder Legionäre Regensburg (reserve team) 
 Fürth Pirates
 Füssen Royal Bavarians
 Gauting Indians
 Ingolstadt Schanzer
 München Caribes
 Raiffeisen Wölfe Lauf

Neuenburg Atomics
Baldham Boars
Erbach Grasshoppers
Heidenheim Heideköpfe (reserve team)
Ingolstadt Schanzer
Ladenburg Romans
Buchbinder Legionäre (reserve team)
Tübingen Hawks

References